Rabbi Yosef Bittón is an Argentinian-born community rabbi and the former Chief Rabbi of Uruguay.

Biography

Early life and education 
Rabbi Yosef Bittón was born in Argentina to Argentine parents. His paternal grandparents came from Tetouan, Morocco, and his maternal grandparents were from Damascus, Syria. 

Bittón received his rabbinic ordination from the Chef Rabbinate of Israel and his Dayanut ordination from Rabbi Ovadiah Yosef. He began his academic studies at Yeshiva University. He also studied at Bar-Ilan, where he got his first degree in the Hebrew language, Biblical studies, and Talmud. In addition, Bittón studied at Hebrew University, Ben Gurion University in Beer Sheva and in the Department of Religion at Emory University in Atlanta, GA.

Rabbinical career 
Rabbi Bittón served for more than 35 years as a community rabbi in Buenos Aires, Montevideo and currently in the United States, where he is the rabbi of the Congregation Shaare Rachamim, belonging to the UMJCA, the United Mashadi Jewish Community of America, in Great Neck, New York.

Since 1985 he has served as Rabbi of Congregation Chalom. He then became the rabbi of the Agudat Dodim Community until 1996, both Sephardic congregations in Buenos Aires, Argentina.

In 1996 Bittón organized a community immigration project (Aliyá) with the vice-mayor of the city of Dimona, Israel, Mr. Albert Asaf. Rabbi Bittón and his family were joined by 40, the majority belonging to the Agudat Dodim community of Flores, Buenos Aires. 

In 1998, he returned to South America as Chief Rabbi of Uruguay where he was spiritual leader to over 25,000 families for four years.

In 2004, he moved to New York, where he now lives with his wife Coty, children, and grandchildren. He is the rabbi of the congregation Congregation Shaare Rachamim.

Published works

Books written by Rabbi Yosef Bittón 
His first book was A Talmudic analysis of the story of Cinderella.  

His best-known book is Awesome creation, an analysis of the first three verses of Genesis, Genesis Chapter 1, verses 1–3. This book has been translated into Spanish and Portuguese, and has received coverage in multiple sources.

In 2018, he published Forgotten Giants, the story of 26 Sephardic Rabbis, before and after the expulsion from Spain.
He also completed a book on creation called Dinosaurs in the Bible, on Genesis Chapter 1, Verses 20–22.  The book has been published in Portuguese and soon to be published in English and Spanish.

Daily newsletter 
The daily email of his website, Halakha of the Day  (English and Spanish), reaches 48,000 subscribers.

References

External links
Halakha of the day – by Yosef Bittón
Halaja – by Yosef Bittón
Shaare Rachamim congregation

Chief rabbis of Uruguay
Year of birth missing (living people)
Living people

Uruguay (biography) articles
Yeshiva University alumni
Emory University alumni